Nathan Robinson may refer to:

 Nathan Robinson (ice hockey), Canadian ice hockey forward
 Nathan Robinson (politician) (1828–1902), member of London County Council
 Nathan J. Robinson, British-American writer and editor-in-chief of Current Affairs
 Nathan J. Robinson (biologist), British marine biologist